("blue library" in French) is a type of ephemera and popular literature published in Early Modern France (between  and ), comparable to the English chapbook and the German . As was the case in England and Germany, that literary format appealed to all levels of French society, transcending social, sex, and age barriers.
 
 is in origin a term for a publishing scheme introduced 1602 in Troyes by  the brothers Jean and Nicolas Oudot, in association with the family of Claude Garnier (1535-1589), who had been printer to the king. Oudot produced prints in low quality and small format. Sold with a blue paper cover, these brochure-like products came to be known as livres bleus, or "blue books".
 
The content matter was at first limited to local ephemera, but it was soon popularized and imitated in other cities such as Rouen, Angers, Caen, Limoges, Avignon, Dinan, Épinal, and perhaps as many as sixty other towns, sold in urban bookshops and carted off into the countryside by itinerant colporteurs (peddlers). This wide distribution represented the historical origin of "popular mass media" in France. Later in the 17th century, the Bibliothèque bleue in Troyes became a family business run by the sons of Jean Oudot, Jean II and Jacques I, later Nicolas II and Nicolas III. The Oudot business soon encountered competition, notably by the Garnier family.

Nicolas III in 1665 married the daughter of a Paris librarian and established himself in the capital, and began to publish in great quantities, on subject matters including theatre, storybook (especially prose retellings of medieval verse novels such as Fierabras, Robert le Diable,  and Jean de Paris), satire (roman picaresque), religious literature, almanacs, manuals on etiquette, cookbooks, songbooks and astrology, etc.
After the death of Nicholas II, his widow continued the Troyes business, and became known throughout the kingdom as the veuve Oudot (widow Oudot), by the  18th century attaining a near-monopoly in the genre.

Oudot went out of business in 1760, due to new legislation limiting the right to reprint works. Garnier persisted into the Republican era, but went bankrupt 1830, as their business model had become outdated and could no longer compete with modern forms of printing publishing led by Louis Hachette and as a result of the centralization of the primary educational system.

See also
Bouquinistes
Pulp magazine
Colportage

References

Bibliography
 Lise Andries, La bibliothèque bleue au dix-huitième siècle : une tradition éditoriale, Oxford, The Voltaire Foundation, 1989 
 Alexandre Assier, La Bibliothèque bleue depuis Jean Oudot 1er jusqu'à M. Baudot (1600-1863), Paris, Champion, 1874
 Geneviève Bollème, La Bibliothèque bleue, éd. Éditions Julliard, collection Archives, 1971, rééd. Robert Laffont, 2003 
René Helot, La Bibliothèque Bleue en Normandie, Rouen, Lainé, 1928, orné de 40 planches de gravures
Marie-Dominique Leclerc & Alain Robert,  Desbloéditions au succès populaire, les livrets de la Bibliothèque bleue XVII-XIXe siècles : présentation, anthologie, catalogue, Troyes, C.D.D.P., 1986  
Robert Mandrou,De la culture populaire aux XVIIe et XVIIIe siècles : la Bibliothèque bleue, Paris, Imago, 1985
 Charles Nisard, Histoire des livres populaires, ou de la littérature de Colportage, depuis le XVe siècle, jusqu'à l'établissement des la Commission d'examen des livres du Colportage, 1852
 La Bibliothèque bleue et les littératures de colportage, Actes du colloque organisé par la Bibliothèque municipale à vocation régionale de Troyes en collaboration avec l'École nationale des Chartes, Troyes, 12-13 novembre 1999 
 Socard: Livres populaires imprimés à Troyes de 1600 à 1800. Paris 1864
 Gérard Oberlé: La Bibliothèque Bleue. Livres de colportage du XVIIe au XIXe siècle. Montigny-sur-Canne 1983.

External links
La littérature de colportage
La Bibliothèque bleue
La Bibliothèque bleue de Troyes and Livrets de la bibliothèque bleue, bois gravés de la bibliothèque municipale de Troyes
 La Bibliothèque bleue : 1600-1863 d'après Alexandre Assier (1874)
Bibliothèque bleue | The ARTFL Project

17th-century French literature
17th-century printing companies
18th-century French literature
18th-century printing companies
Chapbooks
Editorial collections